Aulocystidae is a family of sponges belonging to the order Lychniscosida.

Genera:
 Adaverina Klaamann, 1969
 Adetopora Sokolov, 1955
 Aulostegites Lejeune & Pel, 1973
 Cystitrypanopora Jia, 1977
 Lychnocystis Reiswig, 2002
 Neoaulocystis Zhuravleva, 1962
 Pachyphragma Watkins, 1959
 Plexituba Stainbrook, 1946
 Pseudoromingeria Yabe & Sugiyama, 1941

References

Sponges